The 2017 Turkmenistan Cup is the 24th season of the Turkmenistan Cup knockout tournament. The cup winner qualifies for the 2018 AFC Cup.

The draw of the tournament was held on 10 July 2017.

Round 1

1st leg

2nd leg

Quarter-finals

1st leg

2nd leg

Semi-finals

1st leg

2nd leg

Final

See also
2017 Ýokary Liga

External links
Official website 
Football of Turkmenistan, VK.com

References

Turkmenistan Cup
Turkmenistan
Turkmenistan Cup